Neale is a surname, and may refer to

 Bill Neale, Canadian figure skater
 Charles Neale (1751-1823), American Jesuit
 Charles Neale, English footballer
 Cornelius Neale, English clergyman
 Douglas Neale, Scottish electric car maker (1895)
 Duncan Neale (born 1939), English footballer
 Earle "Greasy" Neale, American football coach
 Edgar Neale, New Zealand politician
 Edmund Neale, Poet
 Edward St. John Neale, Lieutenant-Colonel and British representative in Japan (1862-1863)
 Edward Vansittart Neale, British Christian Socialist
 Emma Neale, New Zealand novelist and poet 
 Eric Neale, British car designer
 Francis Neale, American Jesuit
 Gerry Neale (1941–2015), British politician
 Greasy Neale, American football and baseball player and coach
 Harry Neale, Canadian broadcaster
 Sir Harry Burrard-Neale, 2nd Baronet, British navy officer and politician 
 Haydain Neale, Canadian singer
 J. Neale, Hampshire cricketer
 Jack Neale, English footballer
 James Neale (1615–1684), English migrant to Maryland
 Joe Neale, American baseball player
 John Neale (disambiguation)
 Keith Neale, English footballer
 Kevin Neale, Australian rules footballer
 Lachie Neale (born 1993), Australian rules footballer
 Leonard Neale, American bishop
 Liam Neale, English rugby union player
 Mark Neale, British documentary and film director
 Michael Neale, British behavior geneticist
 Nathaniel Neale, New Zealand Rugby League player
 Orville Neale, Virginia Tech football coach
 Paddy Neale, Canadian politician
 Peter Neale, English footballer
 Phil Neale, English cricketer
 Raphael Neale, American politician
 Robbie Neale, Canadian ice hockey player
 Robert Neale, American pilot
 Robert E. Neale, American paper folder
 Stan Neale (1894–1918), Australian rules footballer
 Stephen Neale, American philosopher
 Thomas Neale (1641–1699), British founder of the North American Postal Service
 Tom Neale, New Zealand lone occupant of Suwarrow
 Walter Neale (c1600–1639), British explorer and Colonial administrator
 William Neale (disambiguation)

See also
 Kneale
 Neale (disambiguation)
 Neil
 Neal (disambiguation)
 O'Neill (surname)

English-language surnames